The 2000 international cricket season was from May 2000 to September 2000.

Season overview

April

2000 Cable & Wireless ODI Series

May

Pakistan in the West Indies

Zimbabwe in England

2000 Asia Cup

June

Pakistan in Sri Lanka

July

West Indies in England

2000 NatWest Triangular Series

2000 Singer Triangular Series

South Africa in Sri Lanka

August

South Africa in Australia

2000 Singapore Challenge Trophy

References

 
2000 in cricket